Rajalakshmi Institute of Technology (RIT) is an engineering college in Chennai, Tamil Nadu, India. RIT is approved by AICTE and affiliated with Anna University, Chennai and accredited with 'A' Grade in NAAC. RIT is located in Chennai-Bangalore National Highway near satellite city and opposite to EVP film city. RIT is one of the NIRF2020 ranked youngest institute in the state.

The Institution has signed MoU’s with several leading industries and Foreign Universities. Sports facilities such as volleyball, badminton, cricket and track field apart from traditional indoor games.

The college is currently offering the following Under Graduation courses. 
B.Tech. Artificial Intelligence & Data Science,
B.Tech Computer Science and Business Systems,
B.E. Computer & Communication Engineering,
B.E. Computer Science & Engineering,
B.E. Electronics & Communication Engineering,
B.E. Mechanical Engineering.

See also

 Rajalakshmi Institutions

References

External links 

Rajalakshmi Institutions
Engineering colleges in Chennai
Colleges affiliated to Anna University
Educational institutions established in 2008
2008 establishments in Tamil Nadu